This is a list of the members of the 23rd Seanad Éireann, the upper house of the Oireachtas (legislature) of Ireland. These Senators were elected from 24 July 2007 onwards after postal voting closed. The Taoiseach's nominees were announced on 3 August 2007. The Seanad election took place after the 2007 general election for the Dáil. The term of the 23rd Seanad was from 13 September 2007 to 20 April 2011. The 23rd Seanad first met at Leinster House on 13 September 2007. Pat Moylan was elected as the new Cathaoirleach of the Seanad.

Composition of the 23rd Seanad 
There are a total of 60 seats in the Seanad. There are 43 Senators elected by the Vocational panels, 6 elected by the Universities and 11 are nominated by the Taoiseach.

The following table shows the composition by party when the 23rd Seanad first met on 13 September 2007.

Effect of changes 

Notes

^ The 2007 column refers to the state of parties when 23rd Seanad first met in 2007.
^ The November 2010 column refers to the state of parties after the election of Pearse Doherty to the Dáil.
^ The March 2011 column refers to the state of parties after the 2011 Dáil election.

Graphical representation 
This is a graphical comparison of party strengths in the 23rd Seanad in January 2011.

Note: This was not the official seating plan.

List of senators

Changes 
Fourteen senators were elected to the 31st Dáil at the general election on 25 February 2011.

See also 
Members of the 30th Dáil
Government of the 30th Dáil

References

External links 

 
23